Hugh O'Donnell  (15 February 1913 – 9 May 1965) was a Scottish professional footballer. He was the younger brother of fellow footballer Frank O'Donnell. The siblings stayed together for the first sixteen years of their careers, both playing concurrently for Celtic, Preston North End and Blackpool.

O'Donnell made over one hundred league appearances for Preston between 1935 and 1938, scoring 29 goals, before signing for the club's arch-rivals, Blackpool. He made his debut for Blackpool in a goalless draw with Bolton Wanderers at Bloomfield Road on 18 March 1939. He went on to play in the remaining nine games of the season, in the number-11 shirt, and scored their goal in a 2–1 defeat at Arsenal on 10 April 1939.

The following season, 1939–40, was the first season of regional competitions, brought about by the outbreak of World War II in September 1939.

O'Donnell's final game in a Blackpool shirt took place on 23 November 1946, in a 4–2 defeat at Leeds United, his only appearance of the season. He scored the first of Blackpool's goals.

Rochdale became his fourth club, in 1946, and he went on to make forty league appearances for them, scoring fourteen goals.

O'Donnell brought his career to a close with Halifax Town in 1948.

He died on 9 May 1965, aged 52.

References

Sources

External links
O'Donnell's profile at Spartacus Educational
 Profile at Scottish Football Archive

1913 births
1965 deaths
Scottish footballers
Celtic F.C. players
Preston North End F.C. players
Blackpool F.C. players
Rochdale A.F.C. players
Halifax Town A.F.C. players
People from Buckhaven
Footballers from Fife
English Football League players
Scottish Football League players
Association football wingers
FA Cup Final players
Scottish Junior Football Association players
Wellesley Juniors F.C. players